The Montalegre Castle is a Portuguese medieval castle and National monument in Montalegre, Vila Real.

External links
Montalegre Castle at IPPAR 

Buildings and structures in Montalegre
Montalegre
Montalegre